Microsoft Academic was a free internet-based academic search engines for academic publications and literature, developed by Microsoft Research, shut down in 2022. At the same time, OpenAlex launched and claimed to be a successor to Microsoft Academic.

History 

Microsoft Academic gained prominence because it profiled authors, organizations, keywords, and journals and made the dataset available as open data, in contrast to Google Scholar. The search engine indexed over 260 million publications, 88 million of which are journal articles.

Preliminary reviews by bibliometricians suggested the new Microsoft Academic Search was a competitor to Google Scholar, Web of Science, and Scopus for academic research purposes as well as citation analysis. However, it was primarily used as a resource in the field of computer science since that was the most completely indexed information.

On May 4, 2021, Microsoft announced that the Microsoft Academic website and APIs would be retired on December 31, 2021.

Thanks to the open data license, the Microsoft Academic dataset was able to be merged into OpenAlex. However, the underlying software was proprietary and had to be rewritten.

The fact that Microsoft launched and soon after shut down both Microsoft Academic and its predecessor Microsoft Academic Search has been interpreted as a sign that Microsoft "had never intended to enter into the business of scholarly metadata. Instead, the tech giant has been using data on scholarly communication as testing ground for big data and artificial intelligence (AI) technologies".

Technology 
The Academic Knowledge API offered information retrieval from the underlying database using REST endpoints for advanced research purposes. The search engine provided not only search results and access to sources but also citation information that include the number of sources, g-index, and h-index. Aside from academic publications, it was also used to find websites that contain state and local records. The technology uses machine learning, semantic inference and knowledge discovery from sources crawled and indexed by the Bing search engine.

Microsoft Academic replaced the earlier Microsoft research project, Microsoft Academic Search, which ended development in 2012. The platform was developed in 2009 of the Microsoft Research branch in Asia and the project was headed by Zaiqing Nie. Microsoft Academic was re-launched in 2016, as a tool that features an entirely new data structure and search engine using semantic search technologies.

See also
 OpenAlex
 Microsoft Academic Search
 Live Search Academic
 List of academic databases and search engines

References

External links

 Microsoft Academic website
 Project description on Microsoft Research website

Internet properties with year of establishment missing
Online databases
Microsoft websites
Scholarly search services
Bibliographic databases and indexes
Internet properties established in 2016